Joyosa may refer to:

 La Joyosa, Zaragoza, Spain
 Villajoyosa (La Vila Joiosa), Alicante, Spain
 Gioiosa Ionica (Joyosa Ionica), Calabria, Italy